James Skerrett, fl. 1513–1532, Mayor of Galway.

Skerrett was a descendant of Richard Huskard, and seems to have served two consecutive terms. He had served on the corporation as bailiff in 1513. Among the statues passed while he was Mayor was one denying permission for anyone to leave the town after the town gates were closed.

20th-century Irish writer Liam O'Flaherty (1896–1984) used the surname as the title character for one of his novels.

References
 History of Galway, James Hardiman, Galway, 1820.
 Old Galway, Maureen Donovan O'Sullivan, 1942.
 Henry, William (2002). Role of Honour: The Mayors of Galway City 1485-2001. Galway: Galway City Council.  
 Martyn, Adrian (2016). The Tribes of Galway: 1124-1642

Mayors of Galway
16th-century Irish politicians